The Cheyenne and Arapaho Tribes are a united, federally recognized tribe of Southern Arapaho and Southern Cheyenne people in western Oklahoma.

History
 The Cheyennes and Arapahos are two distinct tribes with distinct histories. The Cheyenne (Tsitsistas/ The People) were once agrarian, or agricultural, people located near the Great Lakes in present-day Minnesota. Grinnell notes the Cheyenne language is a unique branch of the Algonquian language family and, The Nation itself, is descended from two related tribes, the Tsitsistas and the Suh' Tai. The latter is believed to have joined the Tsitsistas in the early 18th century (1: 1–2). The Tsitsistas and the Suh' Tai are characterized, and represented by two cultural heroes who received divine articles which shaped the time-honored belief systems of the Southern and Northern families of the Cheyenne Nation. The Suh' Tai, represented by a man named Erect Horns, were blessed with the care of a sacred Buffalo Hat, which is kept among the Northern family. The Tsitsistas, represented by a man named Sweet Medicine, were bestowed with the care of a bundle of sacred Arrows, kept among the Southern Family. Inspired by Erect Horn's vision, they adopted the horse culture in the 18th century and moved westward onto the plains to follow the buffalo. The prophet Sweet Medicine organized the structure of Cheyenne society, including the Council of Forty-four peace chiefs and the warrior societies led by prominent warriors.

The Arapaho, also Algonquian speaking, came from Saskatchewan, Montana, Wyoming, eastern Colorado, and western South Dakota in the 18th century. They adopted horse culture and became successful nomadic hunters. In 1800, the tribe began coalescing into northern and southern groups. Although the Arapaho had assisted the Cheyenne and Lakota in driving the Kiowa and Comanche south from the Northern Plains, in 1840 they made peace with both tribes. They became prosperous traders, until the expansion of American settlers onto their lands after the Civil War.

The Cheyenne and Arapaho formed an alliance in the 18th and 19th centuries. Together they were a formidable military force, successful hunters, and active traders with other tribes. At the height of their alliance, their combined hunting territories spanned from Montana to Texas.

The Arapaho signed the Fort Laramie Treaty with the U.S. in 1851. It recognized and guaranteed their rights to traditional lands in portions of Colorado, Kansas, Nebraska, and Wyoming. The U.S. could not enforce the treaty, however, and European-American trespassers overran Indian lands. There were repeated conflicts between settlers and members of the tribes.

The U.S. government brought the tribes to council again in 1867 to achieve peace under the Medicine Lodge Treaty. It promised the Arapaho a reservation in Kansas, but they disliked the location. They accepted a reservation with the Cheyenne in Indian Territory, so both tribes were forced to remove south near Fort Reno at the Darlington Agency in present-day Oklahoma.

The Dawes Act broke up the Cheyenne-Arapaho land base. All land not allotted to individual Indians was opened to settlement in the Land Run of 1892. The Curtis Act of 1898 dismantled the tribal governments in an attempt to have the tribal members assimilate to United States conventions and culture.

After the Oklahoma Indian Welfare Act passed in 1936, the Cheyenne and Arapaho organized a single tribal government in 1937. The Indian Self-Determination Act of 1975 further enhanced tribal development.

Economic development
The tribe operates three tribal smoke shops and five casinos: the Lucky Star Casino in Clinton, the Lucky Star Casino in Concho, the Lucky Star Casino in Watonga, the Lucky Star Casino in Hammon,  and the Lucky Star Casino in Canton. They also issue their own tribal vehicle tags. Their economic impact is estimated at $32 million.

Government

The Cheyenne and Arapaho Tribes are headquartered in Concho, Oklahoma. Of 12,185 enrolled tribal members, 8,664 live within the state of Oklahoma. The tribal jurisdictional area includes Beckham, Blaine, Canadian, Custer, Dewey, Ellis, Kingfisher, Roger Mills, and Washita Counties.

The tribal government consists of the Tribal Council, Executive Branch, Legislative Branch, and Judicial Branch. The Tribal Council includes all tribal members over the age of 18. The Executive Branch is led by the Governor and Lieutenant Governor. The Legislative Branch is made up of legislators from the four Arapaho districts and four Cheyenne districts. The Judicial Branch includes a Supreme Court, including one Chief Justice and four Associate Justices; a Trial Court, composed of one Chief Judge and at least one Associate Judge; and any lower courts deemed necessary by the Legislature. In 2006 the tribes voted and ratified the Cheyenne and Arapaho Tribes Constitution which replaced the 1975 constitution.

Institutions
The Cheyenne and Arapaho Tribal Tribune is the tribe's newspaper. ''CATV channel 47'' is the tribe's low power FCC licensed television station. CATV's call letters are K35MV-D. The Cheyenne-Arapaho Tribes of Oklahoma Culture and Heritage Program teaches hand games, powwow dancing and songs, horse care and riding, buffalo management, and Cheyenne and Arapaho language, and sponsored several running events.

College
In partnership with Southwestern Oklahoma State University, the tribe founded the Cheyenne and Arapaho Tribal College on August 25, 2006. Henrietta Mann, enrolled tribal member, was president in 2009. The campus was in Weatherford, Oklahoma and the school offered programs in Tribal Administration, American Indian Studies, and General Studies. The Cheyenne and Arapaho Tribal College Board of Regents voted to dissolve the Cheyenne and Arapaho Tribal College at the end of the 2015 spring semester.  However, in September of 2019 the tribe developed a replacement by chartering Bacone College in Muskogee, Oklahoma as its school.

Buffalo program
For cultural and food sovereignty purposes, a buffalo herd has been established. The herd expanded to 530 bison in 2021 when Denver Parks and Recreation donated 13 animals which will improve the herd's genetic diversity. Bison is the correct taxonomic term for Bison bison, but buffalo is the common vernacular term.

Notable tribal members

 Ross Anderson, professional World Cup skier
 William "Hawk" Birdshead, founder of Indigenous Life Movement
 Archie Blackowl (1911–1992), Flatstyle painter
 Chris Eyre, film director and producer, directed the films: Smoke Signals and Skins
 Suzan Shown Harjo, Southern Cheyenne/Muscogee activist, policymaker, journalist, and poet
 Viola Hatch (1930–2019), activist, policymaker, tribal elder, former tribal chairperson
 Lance Henson, poet, painter
 Yvonne Kauger, Oklahoma Supreme Court Justice
 Chief Little Raven (ca. 1810–1889), Arapaho chief and signer of 1867 Medicine Lodge Treaty
 Merlin Little Thunder, Southern Cheyenne artist, noted for miniature paintings
 Henrietta Mann (born 1934) academic and developer of Native American studies curricula at the University of California, Berkeley; University of Montana; and Haskell Indian Nations University
 Chief Niwot (1825–1864), Southern Arapaho leader
 St. David Pendleton Oakerhater, Okuhhatuh, or Making Medicine, Southern Cheyenne (1847–1931), veteran of the Red River War, Fort Marion prisoner of war, ledger artist, deacon of Whirlwind Mission, sun dancer, canonized saint in the Episcopal Church
 Tommy Orange (born 1982), Southern Cheyenne novelist
 Harvey Pratt (Cheyenne-Arapaho), artist, peace chief, forensic artist
 Henry Roman Nose (1956–1917), Southern Cheyenne chief
 W. Richard West Sr., Dick West, or Wahpahnahyah (1912–1996), Southern Cheyenne painter, educator, and Director of Art at Bacone College
 W. Richard West Jr., Cheyenne lawyer and first director of the National Museum of the American Indian
 Wolf Robe (ca. 1840–1910),

Notes

References
 Grinnell, George B. The Cheyenne Indians: Their History and Lifeways Vol 1. Bloomington: World Wisdom, Inc. 2008. Print.

Further reading
Henrietta Mann, "Cheyenne-Arapaho Education 1871–1982", Niwot CO: University Press of Colorado, 1997. 
Raylene Hinz-Penner, "Searching for Sacred Ground: The Journey of Chief Lawrence Hart, Mennonite", Telford, PA:Cascadia Publishing House, 2007
John L. Moore, The Cheyenne, Hoboken, NJ: Wiley-Blackwell, 1996. .

External links
 The Cheyenne and Arapaho Tribes, official website
 Cheyenne and Arapaho Tribes of Oklahoma Constitution and By-Laws
 Cheyenne and Arapaho Tribal College

Native American tribes in Oklahoma
Plains tribes
Algonquian peoples
 
Federally recognized tribes in the United States